Kevin O'Riordan (birth unknown) is a rugby league footballer who plays for the Treaty City Titans in the Irish Elite League. He is a member of Ireland men's national rugby league team.

Background
Kevin O'Riordan was born in Ireland.

References

External links
Statistics at rugbyleagueproject.org
(archived by web.archive.org) Treaty City Titans profile
Ireland 58-18 Russia

Living people
Ireland national rugby league team players
Irish rugby league players
Place of birth missing (living people)
Rugby league players from County Limerick
Year of birth missing (living people)
Rugby articles needing expert attention